(born February 22, 1964) is a Japanese musician, best known as a member of the pop-punk band Shonen Knife. She formed the band in 1981 at age 17, along with her sister Naoko Yamano and Michie Nakatani. In the first incarnation of the band she played drums, but switched to bass when Nakatani departed in 1999. Yamano is also a fashion designer and creates many of the band's stage outfits. Yamano retired from Shonen Knife in 2006 to marry, and moved to Los Angeles. During the next several years she occasionally toured with the band but did not play on their studio albums. She returned to the band as a full-time member in 2016.

References

External links
Shonen Knife biography
From L.A. Knife Atsuko blog

Shonen Knife members
Japanese rock drummers
Japanese rock bass guitarists
Japanese alternative rock musicians
Japanese punk rock musicians
1964 births
Living people
Women bass guitarists
Women drummers
Women in punk
Pigface members